Malaya Ivanovka is a rural locality (a village) in Nagadaksky Selsoviet, Aurgazinsky District, Bashkortostan, Russia. The population was 12 as of 2010. There is 1 street.

Geography 
Malaya Ivanovka is located 45 km northeast of Tolbazy (the district's administrative centre) by road. Nizhniye Lekandy is the nearest rural locality.

References 

Rural localities in Aurgazinsky District